The 2016–17 season of the FA Women's Premier League is the 25th season of the competition, which began in 1992. It sits at the third and fourth levels of the women's football pyramid, below the two divisions of the FA Women's Super League and above the eight regional football leagues.

The league features six regional divisions: the Northern and Southern divisions at level three of the pyramid, and below those Northern Division 1, Midlands Division 1, South East Division 1, and South West Division 1. 72 teams were members of the league before the start of the 2016–17 season, divided equally into six divisions of twelve teams. At the end of the season Blackburn Rovers and Tottenham Hotspur, respectively the champions of the Northern and Southern Divisions, qualified for a playoff match against each other which Tottenham Hotspur won 3-0 thus becoming the overall league champion, and winning them promotion to FA WSL 2.

Premier Division

Northern Division

Changes from last season:
Guiseley Vixens and Loughborough Foxes were relegated to Northern Division One and Midlands Division One respectively.
Leicester City  and Middlesbrough were promoted into the Northern Division from Midlands Division One and Northern Division One respectively.
Preston North End was renamed Fylde Ladies after changing its affiliation to AFC Fylde.
Sporting Club Albion was renamed West Bromwich Albion.
Nuneaton Town withdrew from the league the week before the season started.

League table

Results

Southern Division

Changes from last season:
League champions Brighton & Hove Albion was promoted to FA WSL 2.
Plymouth Argyle was relegated to South West Division One.
Swindon Town and Crystal Palace were promoted from South West and South East Division One.
Forest Green Rovers withdrew from the league the week before the season started.

League table

Results

Championship play-off
The overall FA WPL champion was decided by a play-off match held at the end of the season. The winner earned promotion to the FA WSL 2.

Division One

Northern Division One

Changes from last season:
Middlesbrough was promoted to the Northern Division.
Guiseley Vixens was relegated from the Northern Division.
Brighouse Town was promoted from the North East Regional League.
Crewe Alexandra was promoted from the North West Regional League.
Stockport County and Norton & Stockton Ancients were relegated to the regional leagues.

League table

Results

Midlands Division One

Changes from last season:
Leicester City  was promoted to the Northern Division.
Loughborough Foxes was relegated from the Northern Division.
The New Saints was promoted from the West Midlands Regional League.
Long Eaton United was promoted from the East Midlands Regional League.
Peterborough Northern Star and Leafield Athletic were relegated to the regional leagues.

League table

Results

South East Division One

Changes from last season:
Crystal Palace was promoted to the Southern Division.
Stevenage was promoted from the Eastern Region League.
AFC Wimbledon was promoted from the London & South East Regional League.
Bedford was relegated to the regional leagues.
Old Actonians was renamed Actonians.

League table

Results

South West Division One

Changes from last season:
Swindon Town was promoted to the Southern Division.
Plymouth Argyle was relegated from the Southern Division.
Basingstoke was promoted from the Southern Region League.
Brislington was promoted from the South West Regional League.
Gloucester City and Swindon Spitfires withdrew from the league during the 2015–16 season.

 Shanklin withdrew from the league after playing 18 of 22 matches. All results involving Shanklin were expunged.

League table

Results

Reserve Division

Reserve Northern Division

League table

Results

Reserve Midland Division

League table

Results

Reserve Southern Division

League table

Results

References

External links
Official website of the FA Women's Premier League
League results and standings

FA Women's National League seasons
2016–17 in English women's football
2016–17 domestic women's association football leagues